Midila quadrifenestrata is a moth in the family Crambidae. It was described by Gottlieb August Wilhelm Herrich-Schäffer in 1858. It is found in Brazil, Bolivia and French Guiana.

Subspecies
Midila quadrifenestrata quadrifenestrata (Brazil)
Midila quadrifenestrata attacalis Walker, 1859 (Bolivia)
Midila quadrifenestrata subfuscifusa Munroe, 1970 (French Guiana)

References

Moths described in 1858
Midilinae